"Your New Boyfriend" is the sixth single by English singer-songwriter, YouTuber, and Twitch streamer William Gold, better known online as Wilbur Soot. The song was released on 11 December 2020, and appeared at number 100 on the midweek UK chart, published by the Official Charts Company, for the week of 14 December. It officially debuted at number 83 on the UK Singles Chart on 18 December 2020, later peaking at number 65 on 8 January 2021. The song was certified gold by the Recording Industry Association of America (RIAA) on 13 May 2022 for streams and sales amounting to 500,000 units in the US.

Background, release, and reception 
"Your New Boyfriend" is the finale in a trilogy of songs about its focal character, Lonely Boy, being in love with an e-girl. The two prior installments in the trilogy, "I'm in Love with an E-Girl" and "Internet Ruined Me", were both in similar style to "Your New Boyfriend". The song featured background vocals from musician Chevy.

"Your New Boyfriend" was previewed in July 2020 on YouTuber and streamer TommyInnit's Twitch channel, and officially released on 11 December 2020. The song accumulated over 500,000 views on YouTube around two hours after its release, and soon thereafter started "trending" on Twitter in the United States. The song included a reference to the singer-songwriter Jason Derulo, which caused some people to jokingly claim the song as the "bisexual anthem", due to a line from Derulo's single "Get Ugly" frequently being used on TikTok in coming out videos.

The single entered the midweek UK Singles Chart at position 100 on 14 December, and later officially debuted on the UK Singles Chart at number 83 in the week of 18 December. It left the chart the following week, but later reappeared at number 65 in the week of 8 January 2021. The single also appeared on the UK Independent Singles Chart, where it peaked at number 10, the UK Independent Singles Breakers Chart, where it peaked at number 2, and the UK Singles Downloads Chart, where it peaked at number 70. Due to the song's popularity, Gold appeared on Billboard Emerging Artists Chart at number 46 in the week of 26 December 2020. Following Gold's appearance on the Emerging Artists Chart, "Your New Boyfriend" entered the LyricFind Global Chart, also published by Billboard, at number 22 in the week of 2 January 2021. Rolling Stone reported that Gold had sold 9.6 million units in the month of December, which they attributed to "Your New Boyfriend".

On 13 May 2022, the song was RIAA Gold certified.

Music video 
The song's music video was uploaded to YouTube on the same day the song released. The video features its focal character, Lonely Boy (played by Gold), in an office environment as he sings about his displeasure with a female Twitch streamer's new boyfriend, named Jared. The video includes several references to popular culture, such as Lonely Boy's Google profile picture being of a sad male anime character. In the video, the female Twitch streamer's name appears on screen as "Pandora Braithwaite", the name of a fictional character in the Adrian Mole series of books by Sue Townsend. The video was edited together by Wilbur Soot himself and Elodie Grenville, an English YouTuber best known for being the editor for both Wilbur and TommyInnit.

Personnel 
Credits adapted from YouTube.

 William Gold (credited as Wilbur Soot) – vocals, piano, drums, guitars, songwriter, producer, video editor
 Chevy – (E-girl) backing vocals
 Dmitry Lisenko – bass
 Isaac Beer – trumpets
 Elodie Grenville (credited as elodie.gif) – video editor

Charts

Certifications

References

External links 
 

2020 songs
2020 singles
2020 YouTube videos
Comedy songs